Ádám Vittman (born 23 November 1991 in Nagykanizsa) is a Hungarian striker who currently plays for Zalaegerszegi TE.

External links 
 MLSZ 
 HLSZ 

1991 births
Living people
People from Nagykanizsa
Hungarian footballers
Association football forwards
Zalaegerszegi TE players
FC Ajka players
Nemzeti Bajnokság I players
Sportspeople from Zala County